The Mayer River is a river of Argentina, where it originates, and Chile. It flows into the O'Higgins/San Martin Lake, the deepest lake in the Americas.

See also
 List of rivers of Chile
 List of rivers of Argentina
 Villa O'Higgins
 Carretera Austral

References
 Rivers of Chile website, Mayer River

Rivers of Chile
Rivers of Aysén Region
Rivers of Argentina
International rivers of South America